Just Call Me Nobody is a 2010 comedy-martial arts film directed by Kevin Chu. The film is about a bumbling cobbler (Xiao Shen Yang) who becomes a martial arts master.

Plot

In ancient China, a poor shoe repair man Wu Di (Xiao Shen Yang) lives with his mother (Chen Hui-chuen) and is obsessed with martial-arts picture books. Wu Di repairs the shoe of the swordswoman Yuelou (Kelly Lin) and later helps save her in a fight despite having no martial-arts training. She thanks him and says she can be found on Qin Mountain if she is needed. Yuelou is secretly a princess who is due to marry the emperor (Banny Chen) but escape after setting the palace on fire.

Production
Just Call Me Nobody finished filming in later September.

Release
Just Call Me Nobody was released on 3 December 2010 in China and is set to be released in Taiwan on 26 January 2011. On its release in China, the film topped the box office, grossing $9,018,081.

Reception
Derek Elley of Film Business Asia gave the film a rating of three out of ten.

References

2010 martial arts films
2010 films
Chinese martial arts comedy films
Films directed by Kevin Chu
2010s martial arts comedy films
Taiwanese martial arts comedy films
2010 comedy films